Hesperia uncas, the Uncas skipper or white-vein skipper, is a butterfly of the family Hesperiidae. It is found from US Midwest to southern portions of the three Canadian Prairie provinces, north as far as Edmonton, Alberta.

The wingspan is 32–42 mm. There are two generations per year with adults on wing from May to June and again from August to September, in Canada from mid-June to late July. It is found in sandy areas, open woodlands, and sagebrush.

The larvae feed on Deschampsia elongata, Stipa, Bromus rubens, and Poa pratensis. Adults feed on flower nectar from various flowers, including rabbitbrush, needlegrass (Stipa nevadensis), and blue grama (Bouteloua gracilis).

Subspecies
Listed alphabetically:
H. u. fulvapalla Austin & McGuire, 1998
H. u. gilberti MacNeill, 1964
H. u. giuliani Austin & McGuire, 1998
H. u. grandiosa Austin & McGuire, 1998
H. u. lasus (Edwards, 1884)
H. u. macswaini MacNeill, 1964
H. u. reeseorum Austin & McGuire, 1998
H. u. terraclivosa Austin & McGuire, 1998
H. u. uncas Edwards, 1863

References

External links

Uncas Skipper, Butterflies and Moths of North America

Hesperia (butterfly)
Butterflies described in 1863
Butterflies of North America
Taxa named by William Henry Edwards